BVD and similar can mean:

 BVD, a brand of men's underwear
 BVD, back vertex distance, the distance between the back surface of a corrective lens and the front of the cornea.
 Binnenlandse Veiligheidsdienst (General Intelligence and Security Service), the former secret service of the Netherlands
 Bovine viral diarrhea, a disease of cattle
 Bureau van Dijk Electronic Publishing, a major publisher of business information
 BVD, the National Rail station code for Belvedere railway station, London, England